The 1998 WNBA season was the 2nd for the Utah Starzz. The team finished dead last in the West for the second consecutive season.

Offseason

WNBA Draft

Trades

Regular season

Season standings

Season schedule

Player stats

References

External links
Starzz on Basketball Reference

Utah Starzz seasons
Utah
Utah Starzz